Tallinn Black Nights Film Festival, or PÖFF, is an annual film festival held since 1997 in Tallinn, the capital city of Estonia. PÖFF is the only festival in Northern Europe or the Baltic region with a FIAPF (International Federation of Film Producers Association) accreditation for holding an International Competitive Feature Film Program, which places it alongside 14 other non-specialised competitive world festivals including Berlin, Cannes, Venice, Karlovy Vary, Warsaw, and San Sebastian. With over 250 feature-length and over 250 short films and animations from 80 countries (2018) screened, and an attendance of over 80,000 (2018), PÖFF is the one of the largest film festivals in Northern Europe. The festival, its sub-festivals and the audiovisual industry platform Industry@Tallinn hosted around 1200 film professionals and journalists in 2018.

Running concurrently with the festival is Industry@Tallinn and the Baltic Event Co-Production Market, the biggest audiovisual industry meeting in the region. Industry@Tallinn consists of the International Sales and Distributors Meeting Point; the European Genre Forum, a creative camp for genre professionals promoting project and skills development; and two works in progress panels, the presentations of regional upcoming films from Baltic, Finnish and old CIS countries, and international screenings ranging from Asia to Latin America. For 2017 the festival has teamed up with the Culture Ministry of Estonia to co-host and co-curate the Estonia’s European Union Presidency Conference Pictured Futures: Connecting Content, Tech & Policy In Audiovisual Europe.

In addition, two sub-festivals take part concurrently with the main program: Children’s and Youth Film Festival Just Film, and PÖFF Shorts, dedicated to short films and animations . BNFF also organises two smaller off-season events: the only genre film event in the Baltic countries Haapsalu Horror and Fantasy Film Festival taking place in April every year and Tartu Love Film Festival tARTuFF, taking place in August.

History
Starting in 1997 with 4,500 attendances, PÖFF was originally primarily a showcase for Nordic films, but as the festival grew it dramatically expanded its overview. Today PÖFF is the largest film gathering in Northern Europe. During its 19th edition in 2015, the festival screened more than 600 films (including 250+ feature-length films from 80 countries), bringing over 900 screenings to an audience of over 80,000 people, including over 700 accredited guests and journalists from 50 countries. In 2010 the festival hosted the European Film Awards ceremony in Tallinn, and in 2015 the European Film Forum conference was held in co-operation with the European Commission.
PÖFF was recognized by FIAPF in 2011 and upgraded to an A-list festival in 2014, making it the first festival in Northern Europe to gain a Competitive Feature Film Festival accreditation, joining only 14 other major world festivals.

Every year, the Black Nights Film Festival employs more than 300 volunteers. They help with ticket sales, checking tickets, escort of delegations, work at information desks, etc.

Some notable filmmakers, actors, and industry professionals who have visited PÖFF include Aki Kaurismäki, Krzysztof Zanussi, Olga Kurylenko, Sergei Loznitsa, Lee Joon-ik, Jos Stelling, Jan Troell, Catherine Breillat, Roy Andersson, Fridrik Thor Fridriksson, Neil Jordan, Philip Glass, Lukas Moodysson, Michael Nyman, Jerzy Stuhr, Tom Schilling, Pen-ek Ratanaruang, Isaach de Bankole, Pavel Lungin, Fiona Shaw, Ross Partridge, and Mikael Persbrandt, along with many others.

Awards

Official Selection

Grand Prix for the Best Film 
Jury prize for Best Director 
Jury Prize for Best Script
Jury Prize for Best Actress
Jury Price for Best Actor
Jury Prize for Best Cinematographer 
Jury Prize for Best Music 
Award by the jury of International Federation of Film Critics (FIPRESCI)
Cross Religion award presented by spiritual leaders of largest congregations in Estonia

The First Feature Competition

The Baltic Film Competition
 Best Baltic Film

Additional Awards for Feature-Length Films
Audience Award 
Rebel with a Cause Award
Award for Best Asian film by the jury of Network for the Promotion of
Asian Cinema (NETPAC)
Bruno O’ya Award
Lifetime Achievement Award

Grand Prix winners

Industry@Tallinn
Tallinn Black Nights' industry program, consisting of the Industry@Tallinn industry summit and the Baltic Event Regional Co-Production Film Market, is a platform aiming to connect Northern Europe with Asia, the US, and South America. It hosts 700+ industry guests annually. The 2017 edition of Industry@Tallinn will include screenings of works in progress, a Sales Agents and Distributors Meeting Point, a European Genre Forum, an acting talent showcase: Screen Stars Tallinn, the Estonian EU Presidency Conference, an Audiovisual Content, Technology, and Policy Conference, and much more.

Sub-Festivals

Just Film
Just Film – Youth and Children's Film Festival. Official website
Just Film is the largest children's and youth film festival in the region. The festival includes a youth and a children's programme, an international youth film competition programme as well as ECFA competition programme, a children's rights programme, and two programmes of documentaries - one about lifestyle and sports (Doc@Just) and the other about science (Science360). The festival is truly designed for its young audiences; the best films are selected by juries of local youth, and the festival blog is filled by young film critics posting their daily reviews of films.

PÖFF Shorts
PÖFF Shorts - a shorts and animation film festival that includes several competition programs judged by international juries.

23rd Tallinn Black Nights Film Festival: 5 November - 1 December 2019
 Tallinn Black Nights Film Festival main program, 15 November - 1 December 2019
 PÖFF Shorts, 19–27 November 2019
 Children and Youth Film Festival, Just Film, 15 November - 1 December 2019
 Industry@Tallinn, 25–29 November 2019

References

External links
 

Film festivals in Estonia
Culture in Tallinn